Pain Mahalleh-ye Golrudbar (also Romanized as Pā’īn Maḩalleh-ye Golrūdbār and Pā’īn Maḩalleh-ye Gol-e Rūdbār; also known as Galrūdbār) is a village in Baz Kia Gurab Rural District, in the Central District of Lahijan County, Gilan Province, Iran. At the 2006 census, its population was 188, in 58 families.

References 

Populated places in Lahijan County